Guelph—Wellington was a provincial electoral district in Ontario, Canada, that was represented in the Legislative Assembly of Ontario from 1999 to 2007.

The riding was created in 1999 from Guelph and Wellington and abolished in 2007 back into Guelph and into Wellington—Halton Hills. It consisted of the city of Guelph as well as the townships of Puslinch and Guelph/Eramosa.

Members of Provincial Parliament

Election results

External links
 Elections Ontario  1999 results and 2003 results

Former provincial electoral districts of Ontario